Gastón Alexis Silva Perdomo (born 5 March 1994) is a Uruguayan professional footballer who plays as a defender for Liga MX club Puebla.

Club career

Defensor Sporting
He began his professional career in Defensor Sporting, debuting on 8 November 2011, at age 16, in the 0–2 away win against Montevideo Wanderers, substituting Brahian Alemán. On 18 April 2012 he made his official debut in the Copa Libertadores in a 1–3 away win against Argentina's Club Atlético Vélez Sarsfield. He made a total of 29 appearances and provided 2 assists between the Uruguayan Primera División and Copa Libertadores

In the 2011–12 Uruguayan Primera División season he played a game in the Apertura tournament, but was often a starter in the Clausura tournament, contributing to the final victory. The following season, he played in all 17 games in the league and four in the Copa Libertadores, confirming his position as one of the emerging prospects of Uruguayan football.

Torino
On 21 July 2014 Silva transferred to Serie A side Torino for €2.3 million, signing a four-year contract with an option for a fifth. On 18 September he made his debut for Torino in the UEFA Europa League against Club Brugge; he scored his first goal ever for Torino in the cup against Copenhagen, ending 1–5.

Granada (loan)
On 18 August 2016, Silva joined Spanish side Granada CF on a season-long loan deal. He made his La Liga debut ten days later, replacing Gabriel Silva in a 1–5 away loss against UD Las Palmas.

Pumas UNAM–Independiente Controversy
On 24 July 2017, it was announced that Mexican club Pumas UNAM had signed Silvia on a two-year contract. However, on 27 July Italian side Torino (the club that held the  contractual rights of the player) had announced that Silva was officially transferred to Pumas UNAM. Silva was expected to appear in Mexico City for the contract signing on 31 July but sources in Argentina indicated that said player had already passed medical examinations and eventually signed with Argentine Club Independiente even though his pay would be much less than that Pumas UNAM had offered. Pumas UNAM was not aware of this action which generated much disappointment. On 1 August 2017 UNAM stated in a press conference that they would take the proper measures and possibly enact legal action against Gastón Silva by consulting with Liga MX and Femexfut executives. The case is currently under investigation and could possibly be taken to FIFA on a later date. Source: Mediotiempo.com.

In June 2018, UNAM loses the case against Silva and is ordered to pay over one million, six hundred dollars ($USD) to Italian side Torino for a player transfer that was never fulfilled.

Huesca
On 3 September 2020, La Liga club Huesca announced the signing of Silva on a one-year deal.

Cartagena
On 23 August 2021, free agent Silva signed a contract with Segunda División side FC Cartagena.

International career
During 2011, Silva played with the Uruguay national U17 football team at the 2011 FIFA U-17 World Cup in Mexico. Previously, he played the 2011 South American Under-17 Football Championship in Ecuador. In 2012, Silva played with the Uruguay national U20 football team at the 2013 FIFA U-20 World Cup in Turkey. In 2011, he was named to participate in the Uruguay national football team under-22 squad for the 2011 Pan American Games.

On 1 November 2014, Silva was called up to the Uruguay national team by Óscar Tabárez for two friendly matches on 13 and 18 November against Costa Rica and Chile.

In May 2018 he was named in Uruguay's provisional 26 man squad for the 2018 World Cup in Russia.

Personal life
His older brother Martín Silva is also a footballer who plays for Bra in Serie D.

Silva also holds Italian nationality, thus not restricted by the league regulation on non-European Union citizens.

Style of play
Naturally left-footed, at Defensor Sporting he was fielded as a left full-back, his preferred role, while in the national team he is often used as a central defender. Proficient in the tackle, Silva has excellent technique, physicality and ability in the air.

Career statistics

Club

International
Statistics accurate as of match played 12 October 2018.

Honours
Independiente
Copa Sudamericana: 2017

International
Uruguay U-17
2011 FIFA U-17 World Cup: Runner-Up
2011 South American Under-17 Football Championship: Runner-Up
 2013 FIFA U-20 World Cup: Runner-Up

References

External links
Profile at goal.com

Living people
1994 births
Uruguayan people of Italian descent
Uruguayan people of Galician descent
Uruguayan footballers
Uruguayan expatriate footballers
Uruguayan Primera División players
Serie A players
La Liga players
Liga MX players
Argentine Primera División players
Defensor Sporting players
Torino F.C. players
Granada CF footballers
Club Universidad Nacional footballers
Club Atlético Independiente footballers
SD Huesca footballers
FC Cartagena footballers
Association football defenders
Footballers at the 2011 Pan American Games
Uruguayan expatriate sportspeople in Italy
Uruguayan expatriate sportspeople in Mexico
Uruguayan expatriate sportspeople in Spain
Expatriate footballers in Italy
Expatriate footballers in Mexico
Expatriate footballers in Spain
Uruguay youth international footballers
Uruguay under-20 international footballers
Uruguay international footballers
2015 Copa América players
Copa América Centenario players
Pan American Games medalists in football
Pan American Games bronze medalists for Uruguay
Footballers from Salto, Uruguay
2018 FIFA World Cup players
Medalists at the 2011 Pan American Games